Paul Erdős (26 March 1913 – 20 September 1996) was a Hungarian mathematician. He was one of the most prolific mathematicians and producers of mathematical conjectures of the 20th century.  pursued and proposed problems in discrete mathematics, graph theory, number theory, mathematical analysis, approximation theory, set theory, and probability theory. Much of his work centered around discrete mathematics, cracking many previously unsolved problems in the field. He championed and contributed to Ramsey theory, which studies the conditions in which order necessarily appears. Overall, his work leaned towards solving previously open problems, rather than developing or exploring new areas of mathematics.

Erdős published around 1,500 mathematical papers during his lifetime, a figure that remains unsurpassed. He firmly believed mathematics to be a social activity, living an itinerant lifestyle with the sole purpose of writing mathematical papers with other mathematicians. He was known both for his social practice of mathematics, working with more than 500 collaborators, and for his eccentric lifestyle; Time magazine called him "The Oddball's Oddball". He devoted his waking hours to mathematics, even into his later years—indeed, his death came only hours after he solved a geometry problem at a conference in Warsaw. Erdős's prolific output with co-authors prompted the creation of the Erdős number, the number of steps in the shortest path between a mathematician and Erdős in terms of co-authorships.

Life
Paul Erdős was born on 26 March 1913, in Budapest, Austria-Hungary, the only surviving child of Anna (née Wilhelm) and Lajos Erdős (né Engländer). His two sisters, aged three and five, both died of scarlet fever a few days before he was born. His parents, both Jewish, were high school mathematics teachers. His fascination with mathematics developed early—he was often left home by himself because his father was held captive in Siberia as an Austro-Hungarian prisoner of war during 1914–1920, causing his mother to have to work long hours to support their household. His father had taught himself English while in captivity, but mispronounced many words. When Lajos later taught his son to speak English, Paul acquired his unique pronunciations, which he continued to use for the rest of his life.

He taught himself to read through mathematics texts that his parents left around in their home. By the age of four, given a person's age, he could calculate in his head how many seconds they had lived. Due to his sisters' deaths, he had a close relationship with his mother, with the two of them reportedly sharing the same bed until he left for college.

At the age of 16, his father introduced him to two subjects that would become lifetime favourites—infinite series and set theory. In high school, Erdős became an ardent solver of the problems that appeared each month in KöMaL, the "Mathematical and Physical Journal for Secondary Schools".

Erdős began studying at the University of Budapest when he was 17 after winning a national examination. At the time, admission of Jews to Hungarian universities was severely restricted under the numerus clausus. By the time he was 20, he had found a proof for Chebyshev's theorem. In 1934, at the age of 21, he was awarded a doctorate in mathematics. Erdős's thesis advisor was Lipót Fejér, who was also the thesis advisor for John von Neumann, George Pólya, and Paul (Pál) Turán. He took up a post-doctoral fellowship at Manchester, as Jews in Hungary were suffering oppression under the authoritarian regime. While there he met Godfrey Harold Hardy and Stan Ulam.

Because he was Jewish, Erdős decided Hungary was dangerous and left the country, relocating to the United States in 1938. Many members of Erdős's family, including two of his aunts, two of his uncles, and his father, died in Budapest during World War II. His mother was the only one that survived. He was living in America and working at the Princeton Institute for Advanced Study at the time. However, his fellowship at Princeton only got extended by 6 months rather than the expected year due to Erdős not conforming to the standards of the place; they found him "uncouth and unconventional".

Described by his biographer, Paul Hoffman, as "probably the most eccentric mathematician in the world," Erdős spent most of his adult life living out of a suitcase. Except for some years in the 1950s, when he was not allowed to enter the United States based on the accusation that he was a Communist sympathizer, his life was a continuous series of going from one meeting or seminar to another. During his visits, Erdős expected his hosts to lodge him, feed him, and do his laundry, along with anything else he needed, as well as arrange for him to get to his next destination.

Ulam left his post at the University of Wisconsin–Madison in 1943 to work on the Manhattan Project in Los Alamos, New Mexico with other mathematicians and physicists. He invited Erdős to join the project, but the invitation was withdrawn when Erdős expressed a desire to return to Hungary after the war.

On 20 September 1996, at the age of 83, he had a heart attack and died while attending a conference in Warsaw. These circumstances were close to the way he wanted to die. He once said,

Erdős never married and had no children. He is buried next to his mother and father in grave 17A-6-29 in the Jewish Kozma Street Cemetery in Budapest. For his epitaph, he suggested "I've finally stopped getting dumber." (Hungarian: "Végre nem butulok tovább").

Erdős's name contains the Hungarian letter "ő" ("o" with double acute accent), but is often incorrectly written as Erdos or Erdös either "by mistake or out of typographical necessity".

Career
In 1934, Erdős moved to Manchester, England, to be a guest lecturer. In 1938, he accepted his first American position as a scholarship holder at Princeton University's Institute for Advanced Study for the next ten years. Despite outstanding papers with Mark Kac and Aurel Wintner on probabilistic number theory, Paul Tura in approximation theory, and Witold Hurewicz on dimension theory, his fellowship was not continued, and
Erdos was forced to take positions as a wandering scholar at the UPenn, Notre Dame, Purdue, Stanford, and Syracuse. He would not stay long in one place, instead traveling among mathematical institutions until his death.

In 1954, the Immigration and Naturalization Service denied Erdős, a Hungarian citizen, a re-entry visa into the United States. Teaching at the University of Notre Dame at the time, Erdős could have chosen to remain in the country. Instead, he packed up and left, albeit requesting reconsideration from the U.S. Immigration Services at periodic intervals. 

Hungary at the time was under the Warsaw Pact with the Soviet Union. Although Hungary limited the freedom of its own citizens to enter and exit the country, in 1956 it gave Erdős the exclusive privilege of being allowed to enter and exit the country as he pleased.

In 1963, the U.S. Immigration Service granted Erdős a visa, and he resumed including American universities in his teaching and travels. Ten years later, in 1973, the 60-year-old Erdős voluntarily left Hungary.

During the last decades of his life, Erdős received at least fifteen honorary doctorates. He became a member of the scientific academies of eight countries, including the U.S. National Academy of Sciences and the UK Royal Society. He became a foreign member of the Royal Netherlands Academy of Arts and Sciences in 1977. Shortly before his death, he renounced his honorary degree from the University of Waterloo over what he considered to be unfair treatment of colleague Adrian Bondy.

Mathematical work
Erdős was one of the most prolific publishers of papers in mathematical history, comparable only with Leonhard Euler; Erdős published more papers, mostly in collaboration with other mathematicians, while Euler published more pages, mostly by himself. Erdős wrote around 1,525 mathematical articles in his lifetime, mostly with co-authors. He strongly believed in and practiced mathematics as a social activity, having 511 different collaborators in his lifetime.

In his mathematical style, Erdős was much more of a "problem solver" than a "theory developer" (see "The Two Cultures of Mathematics" by Timothy Gowers for an in-depth discussion of the two styles, and why problem solvers are perhaps less appreciated). Joel Spencer states that "his place in the 20th-century mathematical pantheon is a matter of some controversy because he resolutely concentrated on particular theorems and conjectures throughout his illustrious career." Erdős never won the highest mathematical prize, the Fields Medal, nor did he coauthor a paper with anyone who did, a pattern that extends to other prizes. He did win the Wolf Prize, "for his numerous contributions to number theory, combinatorics, probability, set theory and mathematical analysis, and for personally stimulating mathematicians the world over". In contrast, the works of the three winners after were recognized as "outstanding", "classic", and "profound", and the three before as "fundamental" or "seminal".

Of his contributions, the development of Ramsey theory and the application of the probabilistic method especially stand out. Extremal combinatorics owes to him a whole approach, derived in part from the tradition of analytic number theory. Erdős found a proof for Bertrand's postulate which proved to be far neater than Chebyshev's original one. He also discovered the first elementary proof for the prime number theorem, along with Atle Selberg. However, the circumstances leading up to the proofs, as well as publication disagreements, led to a bitter dispute between Erdős and Selberg. Erdős also contributed to fields in which he had little real interest, such as topology, where he is credited as the first person to give an example of a totally disconnected topological space that is not zero-dimensional, the Erdős space.

Erdős's problems

Erdős had a reputation for posing new problems as well as solving existing ones - Ernst Strauss called him "the absolute monarch of problem posers".  Throughout his career, Erdős would offer payments for solutions to unresolved problems. These ranged from $25 for problems that he felt were just out of the reach of the current mathematical thinking (both his and others) up to $10,000 for problems that were both difficult to attack and mathematically significant.  Some of these problems have since been solved, including the most lucrative - Erdős's conjecture on prime gaps was solved in 2014, and the $10,000 paid.

There are thought to be at least a thousand remaining unsolved problems, though there is no official or comprehensive list. The offers remained active despite Erdős's death; Ronald Graham was the (informal) administrator of solutions, and a solver could receive either an original check signed by Erdős before his death (for memento only, cannot be cashed) or a cashable check from Graham.

Perhaps the most mathematically notable of these problems is the Erdős conjecture on arithmetic progressions:

If true, it would solve several other open problems in number theory (although one main implication of the conjecture, that the prime numbers contain arbitrarily long arithmetic progressions, has since been proved independently as the Green–Tao theorem). The payment for the solution of the problem is currently worth US$5,000.

The most familiar problem with an Erdős prize is likely the Collatz conjecture, also called the 3N + 1 problem. Erdős offered $500 for a solution.

Collaborators
Erdős' most frequent collaborators include Hungarian mathematicians András Sárközy (62 papers) and András Hajnal (56 papers), and American mathematician Ralph Faudree (50 papers). Other frequent collaborators were the following:

 Richard Schelp (42 papers)
 C. C. Rousseau (35 papers)
 Vera Sós (35 papers)
 Alfréd Rényi (32 papers)
 Pál Turán (30 papers)
 Endre Szemerédi (29 papers)
 Ron Graham (28 papers)
 Stefan Burr (27 papers)
 Carl Pomerance (23 papers)
 Joel Spencer (23 papers)
 János Pach (21 papers)
 Miklós Simonovits (21 papers)
 Ernst G. Straus (20 papers)
 Melvyn B. Nathanson (19 papers)
 Jean-Louis Nicolas (19 papers)
 Richard Rado (18 papers)
 Béla Bollobás (18 papers)
 Eric Charles Milner (15 papers)
 András Gyárfás (15 papers)
 John Selfridge (14 papers)
 Fan Chung (14 papers)
 Richard R. Hall (14 papers)
 George Piranian (14 papers)
 István Joó (12 papers)
 Zsolt Tuza (12 papers)
 A. R. Reddy (11 papers)
 Vojtěch Rödl (11 papers)
 Pál Révész (10 papers)
 Zoltán Füredi (10 papers)

For other co-authors of Erdős, see the list of people with Erdős number 1 in List of people by Erdős number.

Erdős number

Because of his prolific output, friends created the Erdős number as a tribute. An Erdős number describes a person's degree of separation from Erdős himself, based on their collaboration with him, or with another who has their own Erdős number. Erdős alone was assigned the Erdős number of 0 (for being himself), while his immediate collaborators could claim an Erdős number of 1, their collaborators have Erdős number at most 2, and so on. Approximately 200,000 mathematicians have an assigned Erdős number, and some have estimated that 90 percent of the world's active mathematicians have an Erdős number smaller than 8 (not surprising in light of the small-world phenomenon). Due to collaborations with mathematicians, many scientists in fields such as physics, engineering, biology, and economics also have Erdős numbers.

Several studies have shown that leading mathematicians tend to have particularly low Erdős numbers. For example, the roughly 268,000 mathematicians with a known Erdős number have a median value of 5. In contrast, the median Erdős number of Fields Medalists is 3. As of 2015, approximately 11,000 mathematicians have an Erdős number of 2 or less. Collaboration distances will necessarily increase over long time scales, as mathematicians with low Erdős numbers die and become unavailable for collaboration. The American Mathematical Society provides a free online tool to determine the Erdős number of every mathematical author listed in the Mathematical Reviews catalogue.

The Erdős number was most likely first defined by Casper Goffman, an analyst whose own Erdős number is 2. Goffman published his observations about Erdős's prolific collaboration in a 1969 article titled "And what is your Erdős number?"

Jerry Grossman has written that it could be argued that Baseball Hall of Famer Hank Aaron can be considered to have an Erdős number of 1 because they both autographed the same baseball (for Carl Pomerance) when Emory University awarded them honorary degrees on the same day. Erdős numbers have also been proposed for an infant, a horse, and several actors.

Personality

Possessions meant little to Erdős; most of his belongings would fit in a suitcase, as dictated by his itinerant lifestyle. Awards and other earnings were generally donated to people in need and various worthy causes. He spent most of his life traveling between scientific conferences, universities and the homes of colleagues all over the world. He earned enough in stipends from universities as a guest lecturer, and from various mathematical awards, to fund his travels and basic needs; money left over he used to fund cash prizes for proofs of "Erdős problems" (see below). He would typically show up at a colleague's doorstep and announce "my brain is open", staying long enough to collaborate on a few papers before moving on a few days later. In many cases, he would ask the current collaborator about whom to visit next.

His colleague Alfréd Rényi said, "a mathematician is a machine for turning coffee into theorems", and Erdős drank copious quantities; this quotation is often attributed incorrectly to Erdős, but Erdős himself ascribed it to Rényi. After his mother's death in 1971 he started taking antidepressants and amphetamines, despite the concern of his friends, one of whom (Ron Graham) bet him $500 that he could not stop taking them for a month. Erdős won the bet, but complained that it impacted his performance: "You've showed me I'm not an addict. But I didn't get any work done. I'd get up in the morning and stare at a blank piece of paper. I'd have no ideas, just like an ordinary person. You've set mathematics back a month." After he won the bet, he promptly resumed his use of Ritalin and Benzedrine.

He had his own idiosyncratic vocabulary; although an agnostic atheist, he spoke of "The Book", a visualization of a book in which God had written down the best and most elegant proofs for mathematical theorems. Lecturing in 1985 he said, "You don't have to believe in God, but you should believe in The Book." He himself doubted the existence of God, whom he called the "Supreme Fascist" (SF). He accused SF of hiding his socks and Hungarian passports, and of keeping the most elegant mathematical proofs to himself. When he saw a particularly beautiful mathematical proof he would exclaim, "This one's from The Book!" This later inspired a book titled Proofs from the Book.

Other idiosyncratic elements of Erdős's vocabulary include:
 Children were referred to as "epsilons" (because in mathematics, particularly calculus, an arbitrarily small positive quantity is commonly denoted by the Greek letter (ε)).
 Women were "bosses" who "captured" men as "slaves" by marrying them. Divorced men were "liberated".
 People who stopped doing mathematics had "died", while people who died had "left".
 Alcoholic drinks were "poison".
 Music (except classical music) was "noise".
 To be considered a hack was to be a "Newton".
 To give a mathematical lecture was "to preach".
Mathematical lectures themselves were "sermons".
 To give an oral exam to students was "to torture" them.

He gave nicknames to many countries, examples being: the U.S. was "samland" (after Uncle Sam) and the Soviet Union was "joedom" (after Joseph Stalin).  He claimed that Hindi was the best language because words for old age (bud̩d̩hā) and stupidity (buddhū) sounded almost the same.

Signature 
Erdős signed his name "Paul Erdos P.G.O.M." When he became 60, he added "L.D.", at 65 "A.D.", at 70 "L.D." (again), and at 75 "C.D."
 P.G.O.M. represented "Poor Great Old Man"
 The first L.D. represented "Living Dead"
 A.D. represented "Archaeological Discovery"
 The second L.D. represented "Legally Dead"
 C.D. represented "Counts Dead"

Legacy

Books and films 
Erdős is the subject of at least three books: two biographies (Hoffman's The Man Who Loved Only Numbers and Schechter's My Brain is Open, both published in 1998) and a 2013 children's picture book by Deborah Heiligman (The Boy Who Loved Math: The Improbable Life of Paul Erdős).

He is also the subject of George Csicsery's biographical documentary film N is a Number: A Portrait of Paul Erdős, made while he was still alive.

Astronomy
In 2021 the minor planet (asteroid) 405571 (temporarily designated 2005 QE87) was formally named "Erdőspál" to commemorate Erdős, with the citation describing him as "a Hungarian mathematician, much of whose work centered around discrete mathematics. His work leaned towards solving previously open problems, rather than developing or exploring new areas of mathematics." The naming was proposed by "K. Sárneczky, Z. Kuli" (Kuli being the asteroid's discoverer).

See also
List of topics named after Paul Erdős – including conjectures, numbers, prizes, and theorems
Box-making game
Covering system
Dimension (graph theory)
Even circuit theorem
Friendship graph
Minimum overlap problem
Probabilistic method
Probabilistic number theory
The Martians (scientists)

References

Sources

Further reading

External links

 Erdős's Google Scholar profile
 Searchable collection of (almost) all papers of Erdős
 
 
 Jerry Grossman at Oakland University. The Erdös Number Project
 The Man Who Loved Only Numbers – Royal Society public lecture by Paul Hoffman (video)
 Radiolab: Numbers, with a story on Paul Erdős
 Fan Chung, "Open problems of Paul Erdős in graph theory"

 
1913 births
1996 deaths
20th-century Hungarian mathematicians
Mental calculators
Hungarian agnostics
Hungarian atheists
Jewish atheists
Jewish agnostics
Hungarian Jews
Graph theorists
Set theorists
Number theorists
Network scientists
Probability theorists
Austro-Hungarian mathematicians
Mathematicians from Budapest
Foreign Members of the Royal Society
Members of the Hungarian Academy of Sciences
Members of the Royal Netherlands Academy of Arts and Sciences
Eötvös Loránd University alumni
Institute for Advanced Study visiting scholars
Academics of the Victoria University of Manchester
Stanford University faculty
Syracuse University faculty
University of Pennsylvania faculty
Mathematicians at the University of Pennsylvania
University of Notre Dame faculty
Purdue University faculty
Princeton University faculty
Foreign associates of the National Academy of Sciences
Wolf Prize in Mathematics laureates
Asexual men